Baihakki bin Khaizan (born 31 January 1984) is a former Singaporean professional footballer who played as a defender for the Singapore national team.

Football career

Club career 
Along with Khairul Amri, Shahril Ishak and Hassan Sunny, Baihakki was in the pioneer batch of the National Football Academy in 2000. He started his professional career with Geylang United in 2003.
 
An ever-present for Singapore so far since 2004, Baihakki Khaizan's rise to prominence has been an extremely swift one.
He is recognised as one of the best centre backs in the region with his tough tackling no nonsense approach often putting fear into opposition forwards. In the National Football Academy age-group squads, he caught the eye with his 1.9m stature, instinctive confidence and composure at the back.

S. League career 
Signing on with Geylang United in 2003, Baihakki took the Young Player of the Year award in his debut S.League season. After learning his craft alongside former Singapore international Lim Tong Hai – a player he considers a big influence – that year, the lanky defender then moved to the Young Lions in 2004 and captained them in the S.League.

Baihakki nearly missed out playing for the 2007 S-League season after MINDEF refused to release him to play as he was serving National Service. However, he got the green light after a few games into the season. In 2008, again, his army conscription clashed with his football career, and thus he missed the first few games of the new season for his new team, Geylang United.

Indonesia Super League career 
In September 2009, Khaizan agreed terms with Indonesia Super League side, Persija Jakarta, along with his Singaporean compatriot, Mustafic Fahrudin to join them before the 2009–10 Indonesia Super League started in October. During his first season, he managed to score 3 goals in 39 appearances.

In a controversial decision, Baihakki left Persija Jakarta for fierce rivals, Persib Bandung at the end of the 2009-10 Indonesia Super League season. At Persib Bandung, he linked up with his Singaporean compatriot, Shahril Ishak, who also signed for the Indonesian club. Baihakki's stint at Persib was cut short as he was released from the club after 6 months.

On 16 February 2011, Baihakki signed a two-year deal with Medan Chiefs worth approximately US$300,000, along with Shahril Ishak, who was also released by Persib.

Return to Singapore 
Baihakki returned to Singapore with newly formed team, LionsXII, that was competing in the Malaysia Super League. He scored their first ever goal in their league debut against Kelantan FA on 10 January 2012. Baihakki went on to win his first Malaysia Super League title with LionsXII during the 2013 Malaysia Super League season.

Malaysian Super League 
Baihakki Khaizan signed a four-year contract with Malaysian Super League team, Johor Darul Takzim. After a series of unimpressive performances, he was de-registered from the squad on 18 April 2014 and replaced with Marcos Antonio Elias Santos.

Return to Singapore again 
Baihakki rejoined LionsXII in May 2014. As part of his release, he would not face former club Johor Darul Takzim in their upcoming league fixture.

Return to Malaysian Super League 
Baihakki returned to Malaysia and made his Johor Darul Takzim II F.C. debut in the 2015 Malaysia Premier League season.

Warriors 
Baihakki returned to Singapore to play in the S.League for the 2017 campaign together with the Singapore captain, Shahril Ishak. Following the end of the season, Baihakki was not offered a contract extension and was left without a club and was reportedly considering his options with offers from several clubs within the region. He went for a trial with Saudi Arabian second-tier side Jeddah Club after he was set up by his agent while on an Umrah pilgrimage trip with his family. After impressing in a 5-day trial, Baihakki was offered a 4-month contract by the Saudi side until the end of the season.

Thailand league 
After declining to play in the Middle East, Baihakki was offered a contract to play with Kuala Lumpur FA. However, a last minute deal was offered to him to play in the Thai League 1 with 4 time-winner Muangthong United.

After signing with Muangthong United, Baihakki was immediately loaned out to Thai League 2 side, Udon Thani. He scored his first goal in a 3–0 victory against Thai Honda FC, becoming the first Singaporean to score in the Thai league.

In January 2019, Baihakki signed a one-year deal with newly promoted club Thai League 1 club Trat. He has racked up two goals and an assist in his first 13 games for the club.

Baihakki signed for 2019 Thai League Cup winners PT Prachuap F.C. for the 2020 Thai League 1 season.

Tampines Rovers 
Baihakki inked an 18-month deal with Tampines Rovers FC on June 14. Under the terms of the contract, Baihakki would play for free this season, should the SPL resume after being suspended due to the Covid-19 pandemic.

On April 3, 2021 in a fixture against Hougang United in Hougang Stadium, Baihakki was sent off after receiving a second yellow in the seventieth minute from a soft push on Tomoyuki Doi. The free-kick conceded by him was ultimately scored by Shafiq Ghani.

On 1 February 2022, Baihakki announced his retirement from competitive football.

International career 
He made his debut for the Singapore against Hong Kong on 4 August 2003.

He was part of the team that won the Tiger Cup in 2005 and the 2007 ASEAN Football Championship. Then captain of the Under-23 team, he led the Young Lions out for the 2005 Southeast Asian Games in Philippines and also won a bronze medal for the 2007 edition in Korat, Thailand. He lifted the Suzuki Cup in December 2012, after scoring the eventual winner in the first leg. Singapore went on to beat Thailand 3–1 on aggregate.

Baihakki reached his milestone 100th cap in a friendly match against China on 6 September 2013. He was inducted into the FIFA Century Club in December 2013.

As of January 2018, Baihakki has amassed 129 caps for his country.

In March 2019, Baihakki announced his retirement from international football after amassing 134 caps for the Lions. He came back from retirement for the 2022 World Cup Qualifiers. He played for the Lions in a 2–2 draw against Yemen on September 5, 2019.

Related activities 
After announcing his retirement on 1 February 2022, Baihakki also announced he had taken new roles with the Football Association of Singapore (FAS). He became the Lead of Special Projects and ambassador with FAS.

Outside football 
Baihakki opened his interior design and renovation company in April 2013. He launched his second business, a spa, in March 2014.

Personal life

Baihakki's father, Khaizan bin Muhammad, died when he was three. He has an elder sister and a younger brother.

Baihakki is married to Norfasarie Mohd Yahya, a Singaporean flight attendant, actress and singer. They had been engaged since 1 April 2007. He has two sons and two daughters.

Baihakki is featured in eFootball Pro Evolution Soccer 2020 alongside his Singapore teammate Hariss Harun. He will be the third Singaporean to be featured in a video game after Safuwan Baharudin.

Career statistics

Club
. Caps and goals may not be correct.

 Young Lions and LionsXII are ineligible for qualification to AFC competitions in their respective leagues.

International

International goals
Score and Result list Singapore's goal tally first

|-
| 1. || 15 December 2004 || Lạch Tray Stadium, Haiphong, Vietnam ||  ||  ||  || 2004 AFF Championship || 2004 AFF Championship
|-
| 2. || 9 December 2008 || Gelora Bung Karno Stadium, Jakarta, Indonesia ||  ||  ||  || 2008 AFF Championship || Indonesia vs. Singapore (0:2)
|-
| 3. || 19 December 2012 || Jalan Besar Stadium, Jalan Besar, Singapore ||  ||  ||  || 2012 AFF Championship || 
|-
| 4. || 13 November 2014 || Yishun Stadium, Yishun, Singapore ||  ||  ||  || Friendly || Singapore vs. Laos (2:0)
|-
| 5. || 31 March 2015 || Jalan Besar Stadium, Jalan Besar, Singapore ||  ||  ||  || Friendly || Singapore vs. Guam - 31 March 2015 - Soccerway
|}

Honours

Club
LionsXII
Malaysia Super League: 2013

International
Singapore
AFF Championship: 2004, 2007, 2012
Southeast Asian Games Bronze Medallist: 2007

Individual
S.League Young Player of the Year: 2003
Football Association of Malaysia Awards – Best Defender: 2013
 ASEAN Football Federation Best XI: 2013

Notes

International caps milestones
105th – Jordan, 4 February 2014

See also
 List of men's footballers with 100 or more international caps

References

External links 
 

1984 births
Living people
Singaporean footballers
Singapore international footballers
Geylang International FC players
Singapore Premier League players
Singaporean expatriate footballers
Expatriate footballers in Malaysia
Singaporean expatriate sportspeople in Malaysia
Johor Darul Ta'zim F.C. players
Malaysia Super League players
Expatriate footballers in Indonesia
Singaporean expatriate sportspeople in Indonesia
Persija Jakarta players
Persib Bandung players
Liga 1 (Indonesia) players
Indonesian Premier Division players
FIFA Century Club
LionsXII players
Singaporean people of Malay descent
Association football central defenders
Young Lions FC players
Udon Thani F.C. players
Footballers at the 2006 Asian Games
Footballers at the 2014 Asian Games
Southeast Asian Games bronze medalists for Singapore
Southeast Asian Games medalists in football
Competitors at the 2007 Southeast Asian Games
Asian Games competitors for Singapore